Tsarevich Dmitry Ivanovich of Russia may refer to one of the following two sons of Ivan the Terrible:

Tsarevich Dmitry Ivanovich of Russia (born 1552)
Tsarevich Dmitry Ivanovich of Russia (born 1582)